Fatima-Zahra El Allami (born 26 March 1989 in Meknes) is a Moroccan former professional tennis player.

Tennis career
In her career, El Allami won three singles titles and 12 doubles titles on the ITF Circuit. On 1 November 2010, she reached her highest singles ranking of world No. 433. In July 2009, she peaked at No. 420 in the WTA doubles rankings.

She had been awarded a wildcard for the Grand Prix SAR La Princesse Lalla Meryem every year since 2007, but she never passed the first round.

Playing for Morocco Fed Cup team since 2008, El Allami has a win–loss record of 19–11.

ITF Circuit finals

Singles: 8 (3–5)

Doubles: 18 (12–6)

External links
 
 
 

1989 births
Living people
Moroccan female tennis players
Mediterranean Games bronze medalists for Morocco
Competitors at the 2009 Mediterranean Games
Mediterranean Games medalists in tennis
21st-century Moroccan women